Dávid Ficsór (born 4 October 1986) is a Hungarian professional footballer who plays for Mezőkövesd.

References

External links
MLSZ 
HLSZ 

1986 births
Living people
People from Mezőkövesd
Hungarian footballers
Association football goalkeepers
Mezőkövesdi SE footballers
Nemzeti Bajnokság I players
Sportspeople from Borsod-Abaúj-Zemplén County
21st-century Hungarian people